First man may refer to:
  Protoplasts, a technical term for the legendary first people of any creation myth, including a list of first men and women in different traditions
 Adam and Eve, the first people in Abrahamic religions (Adam and Hawa in Islam; Adam and Chava in Judaism)
 Manu (Hinduism) and Shatarupa, the first people in Dharmic religions
 The first human or human species, see human evolution

Media 
 First Man: The Life of Neil A. Armstrong, the 2005 official biography of American astronaut Neil Armstrong
 First Man (film), a 2018 film adaptation of the biography
 The First Man, Albert Camus' unfinished final novel, published in 1994
 The First Man (film), the 2011 film adaptation of the novel
 The First Men, the initial human settlers of Westeros in George R. R. Martin's A Song of Ice and Fire series
 First Men, name of the extant human species in Olaf Stapledon's Last and First Men
 "First Man" (song), a 2019 song by Camila Cabello from her album Romance

See also
 Anatomically modern human
 Archaic humans
 Dawn man (disambiguation)
 Early man (disambiguation)
 Eponymous founder
 First lady or First gentleman, an honorary title borne by the spouse or partner of an elected head of state
 First woman (disambiguation)
 List of countries and islands by first human settlement
 Most recent common ancestor of humans
 Mitochondrial Eve, the matrilineal most recent common ancestor of all currently living humans
 Y-chromosomal Adam,  the patrilineal most recent common ancestor of all currently living men
 Primus inter pares, a first among equals
 Princeps, the title of Roman emperors